St. Louis Truck Assembly was a General Motors automobile factory that built GMC and Chevrolet trucks, GM "B" body passenger cars, and the 1954–1981 Corvette models in St. Louis. Opened in the 1920s as a Fisher body plant and Chevrolet chassis plant, it expanded facilities to manufacture trucks on a separate line. During World War II, the plant produced the DUKW amphibious vehicles for the military. Another expansion was added for the Corvette line in 1953.

On August 1, 1980, the Caprice/Impala assembly line was closed and contributed to the plant's closing in 1986. During the 1981 model year, Corvette production ceased and was shifted to Bowling Green Assembly Plant in Kentucky  Thereafter, it only built R- and V-series crew cab and cab/chassis trucks before that output was moved to GM's Janesville Assembly. Automobile production and maintenance workers were transferred from the closed truck line to the new Wentzville Assembly in 1986 which produced Buick and Oldsmobile front wheel drive replacements for the old rear wheel drive B Body cars.

At its peak, the plant had 35,000 employees producing 560 vehicles per day. A total of 6,3 million were produced at St. Louis Truck Assembly.

The plant closed on August 7, 1986, although the plant essentially was doomed when on August 1, 1980, the Caprice/Impala assembly line was closed. As of 2022, the Union Seventy Center, a 161-acre industrial warehouse, stands where the former factory operated.

References

General Motors factories
Former motor vehicle assembly plants
Motor vehicle assembly plants in Missouri
Economy of St. Louis
Buildings and structures in St. Louis
1920s establishments in Missouri